This is a list of vexillologists.
Grace Rogers Cooper (1924–2004), former curator of textiles, Smithsonian Institution; former president (1983-1986) and first woman president of NAVA; Whitney Smith Fellow (NAVA)(for an outstanding contribution to North American vexillology); and author, among other publications, of Thirteen-Star Flags: Keys to Identification
 William Crampton (1936–1997), founder of the Flag Institute; recipient of FIAV's 1991 Vexillon; former secretary-general for congresses (1983–1989), President (1993–1997), Fellow, and Laureate of FIAV; and author of many editions of Flags of the World
 Peter Edwards (1931–2019), founder and president of the Burgee Data Archives
 Andriy Grechylo, Ukrainian heraldist and vexillologist and Fellow of FIAV
Ottfried Neubecker (1908–1992), German vexillologist; former president (1973–1981), secretary-general (1981–1983), Fellow, and Laureate of FIAV; and author in 1939 of the German navy Flaggenbuch
William Gordon Perrin (1874–1931), British RAF and naval officer, Librarian of the Admiralty, and author of British Flags: Their Early History, and Their Development at Sea, and of Nelson's Signals in which he established that the flags which had been accepted as denoting Nelson's historic signal at Trafalgar were incorrect.
George H. Preble (1816–1885), American naval admiral and author in 1872 of History of the American Flag
Whitney Smith (1940–2016), founder of the Flag Research Center; editor of the Flag Bulletin; co-founder, secretary-general (1969–1981, 1983–1991), secretary-general for Congresses (1981–1983); founder, former president (1967–1977), president emeritus, and honorary member of NAVA; FIAV Laureate and Fellow; recipient of FIAV's 2007 Vexillon; Whitney Smith Fellow (NAVA)(for an outstanding contribution to North American vexillology); recipient, NAVA's Captain William Driver Award (1983) for best paper delivered at an annual meeting; Fellow, Vexillological Association of the State of Texas; author, among other flag books, of Flags Through the Ages and Across the World, The Flag Book of the United States, and The American Flag: Two Centuries of Concord & Conflict; and originator, in 1957, of the word vexillology to describe the scholarly study of flags.
Bishop D. Ralph Spence (1942-present), FRHSC is a Canadian retired Anglican bishop and vexillographer. They have designed the flags of a number of municipalities in Ontario, Canada - including Hamilton, Burlington, St. Catherine's, & Thorold, ON. An avid flag collector, they have donated much of their 3000 item collection to museums and archives in Canada.
Alfred Znamierowski (1940–2019), Polish-born founder of the Flag Design Center; recipient of FIAV's 2003 Vexillon; Fellow of FIAV; and author of The World Encyclopedia of Flags

See also 
 Vexillology
 Vexillography

 
Vexillologists